The Dorreen station is on the Canadian National Railway main line, located on the west bank of the Skeena River between Cedarvale and Terrace, British Columbia.  The station is still served by Via Rail's Jasper – Prince Rupert train as a flag stop.

History
The Dorreen railway station was established by the Grand Trunk Pacific Railway in 1912. A post office opened in 1925. The Canadian National Railway timetable in 1967 identified Dorreen as a 51 car siding, as of 1969 it was identified as a siding without passenger or freight service. The population of Dorreen was  37 in the 1956 census, 7 in the 1971 census, and there were 6 registered voters in the 1988 federal election. The station is currently still in service as a flag stop.

Footnotes

External links 
Via Rail Station Description

Via Rail stations in British Columbia
Railway stations in Canada opened in 1912
1912 establishments in British Columbia